Skandia (rechristened Wild Thing and Arca in 2019) is a 100  ft maxi yacht built in 2003. She was designed by Don Jones. She won line hours in the 2003 Sydney to Hobart Yacht Race skippered by Grant Wharington.

References

2000s sailing yachts
Sailing yachts built in Australia
Sydney to Hobart Yacht Race yachts